Phelline is a genus of shrubs and the sole member of the family Phellinaceae, a family of flowering plants endemic to New Caledonia. It is placed in the order Asterales and is related to two other small plant families: Alseuosmiaceae and Argophyllaceae. It contains ten species.

Species 

All species in the genus are endemic to New Caledonia. The ten species are listed below.

 Phelline barrierei 
 Phelline billardierei 
 Phelline brachyphylla 
 Phelline comosa 
 Phelline dumbeaensis 
 Phelline erubescens 
 Phelline gracilior 
 Phelline indivisa 
 Phelline lucida 
 Phelline macrophylla

References

Asterales genera
Asterales
Flora of New Caledonia
Endemic flora of New Caledonia